Tore Gunnar Stjerna (a.k.a. Necromorbus) is a Swedish multi-instrumentalist and producer. He has played guitar and drums in the following bands; Nex, Chaos Omen, Corpus Christii, Funeral Mist, Ofermod, Zavorash, In Aeternum. He also founded Necromorbus Studio (NBS Studio) in Sweden. While running the studio, he has produced and mastered albums for bands such as Armagedda, Bitter Peace, Deströyer 666, Inferno, Jess and the Ancient Ones, Leviathan, Mayhem, Merrimack, Noctem, Nominon, and Portrait.

References

External links
 Necromorbus Studio homepage

Swedish heavy metal drummers
Black metal musicians
Living people
1976 births
21st-century guitarists
21st-century drummers
Watain